For the government of India, Part XI of the Constitution of India – consists of Articles on Relations between the Union and States.

Chapter I
Articles 245–255 on Distribution of Legislative Powers

The Constitution provides for a three-fold distribution of legislative subjects between the Union and
the states, viz., List-I (the Union List), List-II (the State List) and List-III (the Concurrent List) in the
Seventh Schedule:
(i) The Parliament has exclusive powers to make laws with respect to any of the matters
enumerated in the Union List. This list has at present 98 subjects (originally 97 subjects)(101st constitutional amendment Act 2016 removed 92 and 92C)
like defence, banking, foreign affairs, currency, atomic energy, insurance, communication,
inter-state trade and commerce, census, audit and so on.
(ii) The state legislature has “in normal circumstances” exclusive powers to make laws with
respect to any of the matters enumerated in the State List. This has at present 59 subjects
(originally 66 subjects) (101st constitutional amendment Act, 2016 removed 52 and 55) like public order, police, public health and sanitation, agriculture,
prisons, local government, fisheries, markets, theaters, gambling and so on.
(iii) Both, the Parliament and state legislature can make laws with respect to any of the matters
enumerated in the Concurrent List. This list has at present 52 subjects (originally 47 subjects)
like criminal law and procedure, civil procedure, marriage and divorce, population control
and family planning, electricity, labour wel-fare, economic and social planning, drugs,
newspapers, books and printing press, and others. The 42nd Amendment Act of 1976
transferred five subjects to Concurrent List from State List, that is, (a) education, (b) forests,
(c) weights and measures, (d) protection of wild animals and birds, and (e) administration of
justice; constitution and organisation of all courts except the Supreme Court and the high
courts.
The power to make laws with respect to residuary subjects (i.e., the matters which are not
enumerated in any of the three lists) is vested in the Parliament. This residuary power of legislation
includes the power to levy residuary taxes.
From the above scheme, it is clear that the matters of national importance and the matters which
requires uniformity of legislation nationwide are included in the Union List. The matters of regional
and local importance and the matters which permits diversity of interest are specified in the State
List. The matters on which uniformity of legislation throughout the country is desirable but not
essential are enumerated in the concurrent list. Thus, it permits diversity along with uniformity.

In US, only the powers of the Federal Government are enumerated in the Constitution and the
residuary powers are left to the states. The Australian Constitution followed the American pattern of
single enumeration of powers. In Canada, on the other hand, there is a double enumeration—Federal
and Provincial, and the residuary powers are vested in the Centre.

The Government of India (GoI) Act of 1935 provided for a three-fold enumeration, viz., federal,
provincial and concurrent. The present Constitution follows the scheme of this act but with one
difference, that is, under this act, the residuary powers were given neither to the federal legislature
nor to the provincial legislature but to the governor-general of India. In this respect, India follows the
Canadian precedent.

The Constitution expressly secure the predominance of the Union List over the State List and the
Concurrent List and that of the Concurrent List over the State List. Thus, in case of overlapping
between the Union List and the State List, the former should prevail. In case of overlapping between
the Union List and the Concurrent List, it is again the former which should prevail. Where there is a
conflict between the Concurrent List and the State List, it is the former that should prevail.
In case of a conflict between the Central law and the state law on a subject enumerated in the
Concurrent List, the Central law prevails over the state law. But, there is an exception. If the state law
has been reserved for the consideration of the president and has received his assent, then the state law
prevails in that state. But, it would still be competent for the Parliament to override such a law by
subsequently making a law on the same matter.

'3. Parliamentary Legislation in the State Field'''
The above scheme of distribution of legislative powers between the Centre and the states is to be
maintained in normal times. But, in abnormal times, the scheme of distribution is either modified or
suspended. In other words, the Constitution empowers the Parliament to make laws on any matter
enumerated in the State List under the following five extraordinary circumstances:

When Rajya Sabha Passes a Resolution: If the Rajya Sabha declares that it is necessary in the
national interest that Parliament should make laws on a matter in the State List, then the Parliament
becomes competent to make laws on that matter. Such a resolution must be supported by two-thirds of
the members present and voting. The resolution remains in force for one year; it can be renewed any
number of times but not exceeding one year at a time. The laws cease to have effect on the expiration
of six months after the resolution has ceased to be in force.
This provision does not restrict the power of a state legislature to make laws on the same matter. But,
in case of inconsistency between a state law and a parliamentary law, the latter is to prevail.

During a National Emergency: The Parliament acquires the power to legislate with respect to
matters in the State List, while a proclamation of national emergency is in operation. The laws
become inoperative on the expiration of six months after the emergency has ceased to operate.
Here also, the power of a state legislature to make laws on the same matter is not restricted. But, in
case of repugnancy between a state law and a parliamentary law, the latter is to prevail.

When States Make a Request: When the legislatures of two or more states pass resolutions
requesting the Parliament to enact laws on a matter in the State List, then the Parliament can make
laws for regulating that matter. A law so enacted applies only to those states which have passed the
resolutions. However, any other state may adopt it afterwards by passing a resolution to that effect in
its legislature. Such a law can be amended or repealed only by the Parliament and not by the
legislatures of the concerned states.
The effect of passing a resolution under the above provision is that the Parliament becomes entitled to
legislate with respect to a matter for which it has no power to make a law. On the other hand, the state
legislature ceases to have the power to make a law with respect to that matter. The resolution
operates as abdication or surrender of the power of the state legislature with respect to that matter
and it is placed entirely in the hands of Parliament which alone can then legislate with respect to it.
Some examples of laws passed under the above provision are Prize Competition Act, 1955; Wild
Life (Protection) Act, 1972; Water (Prevention and Control of Pollution) Act, 1974; Urban Land
(Ceiling and Regulation) Act, 1976; and Transplantation of Human Organs Act, 1994.

To Implement International Agreements: The Parliament can make laws on any matter in the State
List for implementing the international treaties, agreements or conventions. This provision enables the
Central government to fulfil its international obligations and commitments.
Some examples of laws enacted under the above provision are United Nations (Privileges and
Immunities) Act, 1947; Geneva Convention Act, 1960; Anti-Hijacking Act, 1982 and legislations
relating to environment and TRIPS.

During President's Rule: When the President's rule is imposed in a state, the Parliament becomes
empowered to make laws with respect to any matter in the State List in relation to that state. A law
made so by the Parliament continues to be operative even after the president's rule. This means that
the period for which such a law remains in force is not co-terminus with the duration of the
President's rule. But, such a law can be repealed or altered or re-enacted by the state legislature.

4. Centre's Control Over State Legislation
Besides the Parliament's power to legislate directly on the state subjects under the exceptional
situations, the Constitution empowers the Centre to exercise control over the state's legislative
matters in the following ways:

(i) The governor can reserve certain types of bills passed by the state legislature for the
consideration of the President. The president enjoys absolute veto over them.
(ii) Bills on certain matters enumerated in the State List can be introduced in the state legislature
only with the previous sanction of the president. (For example, the bills imposing restrictions
on the freedom of trade and commerce).
(iii) The President can direct the states to reserve money bills and other financial bills passed by
the state legislature for his consideration during a financial emergency.

From the above, it is clear that the Constitution has assigned a position of superiority to the Centre in
the legislative sphere. In this context, the Sarkaria Commission on Centre–State Relations (1983–87)
observed: “The rule of federal supremacy is a technique to avoid absurdity, resolve conflict and
ensure harmony between the Union and state laws. If this principle of union supremacy is excluded, it
is not difficult to imagine its deleterious results. There will be every possibility of our two-tier
political system being stultified by interference, strife, legal chaos and confusion caused by a host of
conflicting laws, much to the bewilderment of the common citizen. Integrated legislative policy and
uniformity on basic issues of common Union–state concern will be stymied. The federal principle of
unity in diversity will be very much a casualty. This rule of federal supremacy, therefore, is
indispensable for the successful functioning of the federal system”.

Chapter II 
Articles 256–263 on Administrative Relations 
Articles 256–261 – General 
 
The Constitution of India, under Article 256 mentions the obligations of the Union and the State. Article 256, states that ‘Every State shall utilize its executive powers in conformity with the laws made by the Parliament and with all the pre-existing laws prevailing in the State, and it further mentions that, the Union may exercise its executive power to give directions to the State as and when the Government of India deems fit for any purpose'.

256. The executive power of every State shall be so exercised as to ensure compliance with the laws made by Parliament and any existing laws which apply in that State, and the executive power of the Union shall extent to the giving of such directions to a State as may appear to the Government of India to be necessary for that purpose.

257 (1) The executive power of every State shall be so exercised as not to impede or prejudice the exercise of the executive power of the Union, and the executive power of the Union shall extend to the giving of such directions to a State as may appear to the Government of India to be necessary for that purpose.

(2) The executive power of the Union shall also extend to the giving of directions to a State as to the construction and maintenance of means of communication declared in the direction to be of national or military importance.

Provided that nothing in this clause shall be taken restricting the power of Parliament to declare highways or waterways to be national highways or national waterways or the power of Union with respect to highways or waterways so declared or the power of the Union to construct and maintain means of communication as part of its functions with respect to naval, military and air force works.

(3) The executive power of the Union shall also extend to the giving of directions to a State as to the measures to be taken for the protection of the railways within the State.

(4) Wherein carrying out any direction given to a State under clause (2) as to the construction or maintenance of any means of communication or under clause (3) as to the measures to be taken for the protection of any railway, costs have been incurred in excess of those which would have been incurred in the discharge of the normal duties of the State if such direction had not been given, there shall be paid by the Government of India to the State such sum as may be agreed, or, in default of agreement, as may be determined by an arbitrator appointed by the Chief Justice of India, in respect of the extra costs so incurred by the State.

Article 257A.  Assistance to States by deployment of armed forces or other forces of the Union.  (Inserted by the Constitution 42nd amendment Act, 1976 and repealed by the Constitution 44th amendment Act, 1978.

Article 258(1).  Notwithstanding anything in this constitution, the President may, with the consent of the Government of a State, entrust either conditionally or unconditionally to that Government or to its officers functions in relation to any matter to which the executive power of the Union extends.

(2) A law made by Parliament which applies in any State may, notwithstanding that it relates to a matter with respect to which the Legislature of the State has no power to make laws, confer powers and impose duties, or authorise the conferring of powers and the imposition of duties, upon the State or officers and authorities thereof.

(3) Where by virtue of this article powers and duties have been conferred or imposed upon a State or officers or authorities thereof, there shall be paid by the Government of India to the State such sum as may be agreed, or, in default of agreement, as may be determined by an arbitrator appointed by the Chief Justice of India, in respect of any extra costs of administration incurred by the State in connection with the exercise of those powers and duties.

Article 258A. Notwithstanding anything in this Constitution, the Governor of a State may, with the consent of the Government of India, entrust either conditionally or unconditionally to that Government or to its officers functions in relation to any matter to which the executive power of the State extends.

(This article was inserted by the Constitution 7th amendment Act, 1956 for the reasons that, while the President is empowered by article 258(1) to entrust Union functions to a State Government or its officers, there is no corresponding provisions enabling the Governor of a State to entrust State functions to the Central Government or its officers.  This lacuna has been found to be of practical consequence in connection with the execution of certain development projects in the States.  It is proposed to fill the lacuna by a new article 258A)

Article 259.  Omitted by the Constitution 7th amendment Act, 1956.

Article 260. The Government of India may by agreement with the Government of any territory not being part of the territory of India undertake any executive, legislative or judicial functions vested in the Government of such territory, but every such agreement shall be subject to, and governed by, any law relating to the exercise of foreign jurisdiction for the time being in force.

Article 261(1). Full faith and credit shall be given throughout the territory of India to public acts, records and judicial proceedings of the Union and of every State.

(2) The manner in which and the conditions under which the acts, records and proceedings referred to in clause (1) shall be proved and the effect thereof determined shall be as provided by law made by Parliament.

(3) Final judgments or orders delivered or passed by civil courts in any part of the territory of India shall be capable of execution anywhere within that territory according to law.

Article 262 – on Disputes relating to waters 
Article 263 – on Co-ordination between States

References

Sources

 
 Part XI text from wikisource

Part 11
Federalism in India